Khaleqabad or Khaliqabad may refer to the following places in Iran:

Kerman Province
 Khaleqabad, Anar, Kerman Province
 Khaleqabad, Bardsir, Kerman Province
 Khaleqabad, Manujan, Kerman Province
 Khaleqabad, Rafsanjan, Kerman Province
 Khaleqabad, Koshkuiyeh, Rafsanjan County, Kerman Province
 Khaleqabad, Ravar, Kerman Province
 Khaleqabad, Rigan, Kerman Province

South Khorasan Province
 Khaleqabad, South Khorasan, a village in Khusf County

Yazd Province

Zanjan Province
 Khaleqabad, Zanjan, a village in Khodabandeh County